Lisaea is a genus of flowering plant in the family Apiaceae, native to from the eastern Mediterranean to the western Himalayas. The genus was first described by Pierre Edmond Boissier  in 1844.

Species
, Plants of the World Online accepted the following species:
Lisaea heterocarpa (DC.) Boiss.
Lisaea papyracea Boiss.
Lisaea strigosa (Banks & Sol.) Eig

References

Apioideae